Dev Govindjee (born 7 August 1947) is a South African former cricketer. He played in 45 first-class matches for Eastern Province between 1971 and 1983. He is now a match referee for the International Cricket Council.

References

External links
 

1947 births
Living people
South African cricketers
Eastern Province cricketers
Place of birth missing (living people)
Cricket match referees